Capergnanica is a comune (municipality) in the Province of Cremona in the Italian region Lombardy, located about  southeast of Milan, about  south of Bergamo and about  northwest of Cremona.

The municipality of Capergnanica contains the frazione (subdivision) Passarera.

Capergnanica borders the following municipalities: Casaletto Ceredano, Chieve, Credera Rubbiano, Crema, Ripalta Cremasca.

References

Cities and towns in Lombardy